Bismillah Khan Mohammadi (born 1961, in Panjshir Province), or Bismillah Khan, is an Afghan politician who served as the defense minister of Afghanistan from 2012 to 2015 and for two months in 2021. From 2002 to 2010, he served as Chief of Staff of the Afghan National Army, and from 2010 to 2012 he held the post of Interior Minister of Afghanistan. He has an anti-Taliban background and once served as a senior commander under Ahmad Shah Massoud. Despite the fall of Kabul to the Taliban in August 2021, Mohammadi claims to remain the minister of defense as part of the government of the National Resistance Front of Afghanistan.

Early years and career
Bismillah Khan Mohammadi was born in 1961 in the Panjshir Province of Afghanistan. An ethnic Tajik, he is the son of Ghausuddin of the Panjshir Valley. After graduating from 14th grade in Abu Hanifa Seminary he enrolled at Kabul Military University. Mohammadi was a former PDPA Parcham member, but after the Soviet invasion of Afghanistan he aligned himself with mujahideen resistance commander Ahmad Shah Massoud.

When the Taliban gained control over large parts of Afghanistan in 1996 establishing their Islamic Emirate of Afghanistan, Bismillah Khan served as Deputy Minister of Defense of the anti-Taliban and still recognized Islamic State of Afghanistan. He was a senior commander in the anti-Taliban resistance, the United Front (Northern Alliance), led by Ahmad Shah Massoud. After the attacks of September 11, 2001, and the subsequent fall of the Taliban regime through United Front ground troops and the U.S. Air Force, Bismillah Khan was appointed commander of Kabul's police force and became a member of the Kabul Security Commission. During that period the security situation in Kabul was better than in other parts of Afghanistan.

Chief of Staff of the Afghan National Army
In 2002, Bismillah Khan became Chief of Staff of the Afghan National Army, a post he held until 2010.

Interior Minister

In June 2010, Bismillah Khan was transferred from his position as Army Chief of Staff to the post of Interior Minister by President Hamid Karzai. As Interior Minister, Mohammadi loudly deplored ethnic fractiousness within the Afghan security forces, stressing national unity and Islamic ethics in the Afghan National Police.

Mohammadi also he would appoint police leadership positions based on merit, after as army chief of staff, he was able to improve the army's capabilities by championing meritocracy. 

One advantage for appointing Mohammadi as the Minister of Interior is the hope of mending the rifts within the Afghan National Army that opened or widened as a result of the U.S. government's plan to begin withdrawing forces in July 2011. Expecting the eruption of a civil war after the American withdrawal,  officers have been gravitating towards ethnic groupings and powerful generals, with Mohammadi and the Pashtu Defense Minister Wardak at the head of the two largest cliques. The departure of Mohammadi from the Ministry of Defense leaves no one who can rival Wardak in stature, which could mean a weakening of centrifugal forces.

One of Mohammadi's strategies is to push greater authority down to local police commanders. When Mohammadi was the Chief of Staff of the Afghan National Army, he enforced the decentralization process within an institution heavily influenced by senior officers who had been trained in the centralized model.

As the Minister of the Interior, Mohammadi stressed the need to curb the corruption that has corroded the government and the people's trust in it. Mohammadi has already begun taking some of the actions essential to the reduction of corruption. He is, for example, keeping tabs on the movements of Ministry of Interior officials, and has fired several police chiefs for corruption.

Minister of Defense
Despite the fall of Kabul to the Taliban in August 2021, Mohammadi still claimed the title of Minister of Defense and was able to publicly  call for the arrest former President Ashraf Ghani, who he accused of "selling away our motherland," on 18 August 2021.

Awards 
Bismillah Khan Mohammadi received the Sayed Jamaluddin Afghani, Ghazi Amanullah Khan and Ahmad Shah Baba awards for his efforts in bolstering the Afghan National Army.

References

External links

Interview: General Bismillah Khan Mohammadi, Chief of General Staff, Afghan National Army
Afghanistan's New Minister of Interior: A Potential Game Changer

Afghan military officers
Living people
Interior ministers of Afghanistan
Defence ministers of Afghanistan
Afghan Tajik people
Jamiat-e Islami politicians
1961 births
People from Panjshir Province